Joelle Mia Renee Joelle, better known by her stage name Joelle, is an actress and singer who made her on-screen debut in Dune (2021), performs in Paul Feig’s Netflix original film The School for Good and Evil playing the character of the same name, Joelle and is due to appear in Sky and MGM+’s second season of Domina playing the role of Vipsania.

Early life and career beginnings
Joelle was referred in her early teens to vocal coach Peggy Still Johnson, a Governor of the Recording Academy Atlanta Chapter by Grammy Award-winning mixer Phil Tan. Joelle was later vocal coached by Daniel Thomas, former choir director of the London Community Gospel Choir.

Joelle made her first media appearances at 13, campaigning about bullying awareness on ABC news in America and on national UK TV. Her TV appearances followed extensive press coverage of a home-made music video "Big in LA" that Joelle had uploaded to YouTube. 
"Big in LA" was nominated for a Golden Trellick Award at the 2013 Portobello Film Festival in London and won the Best Music Video award at the 9th annual LA Femme International Film Festival in Los Angeles. 

In her teens Joelle gained experience in journalism, hosting video interviews for national and independent media outlets with personalities such as Dave Filoni, Mark Hamill and Andy Serkis. 
In 2017 Joelle videoed herself in front of a series of T-shirts hanging in the color sequence of a rainbow, while singing a live performance of "True Colors". The video was posted on Facebook and went viral, receiving over four million views.

Acting career
In 2019, Joelle directed and performed in her first short film, Cover Up, featuring original sound recordings co-created with thirteen-time Oscar-nominated songwriter Diane Warren, who wrote the lyrics and music. 

In 2021 Joelle made her feature film debut in Denis Villeneuve's Dune. In 2022 Joelle played the character Joelle in Paul Feig's Netflix original film The School for Good and Evil. 

Deadline announced in December 2022 that Joelle would be joining the cast of MGM+ and Sky's second season of Domina playing the role of Vipsania, wife of Tiberius.

Alopecia awareness campaigning
Joelle was diagnosed with alopecia universalis at the age of 8 and is an ambassador for the UK charity "Alopecia UK".
Joelle stated in a BBC broadcast in 2017 that she does not think she would be the person she is today if it was not for alopecia and that she is happy. 

In an Evening Standard article in 2022, Joelle described how she has experienced being judged in the entertainment industry, where alopecia has historically been viewed negatively. Joelle commented that she feels this is changing. The article headlined with an image illustrating Joelle in one half of the picture with hair and in the other half without. The picture is an uncropped version of an alopecia awareness campaign poster made public online by Joelle in 2018, which originally contained the text "I see the same person on each side, do you?"

Filmography

Film

Television

References

External links
 
 
 
 Agency profile

Living people
Singers from London
English film actresses
21st-century English actresses
Year of birth missing (living people)
Place of birth missing (living people)
People with alopecia universalis
21st-century English women singers
21st-century English singers